University College Dublin Rugby Football Club is based in Dublin, Ireland, and plays in Division 1A of the All-Ireland League. They play their home games at UCD Bowl.

The club was founded in 1910 and they won their first trophy, the Leinster Junior Challenge Cup, in 1914. In 1924 they won their first Leinster Club Senior Cup. Since 1952 they have also played an annual challenge game, the Colours Match against their rivals Dublin University. In 1993 when the AIB League was expanded to four divisions to include 46 senior clubs, UCD and four other university clubs joined the league.

In 2001 UCD won the AIB League Division 2 title, gaining promotion to Division 1. They have continued to play in the same division until the 2008–09 season when they finished second from bottom and were relegated. They were the first Irish university rugby club to play in AIB League top division and have now been joined by rivals Dublin University Football Club.

Notable players

Ireland national rugby union team
In 1920 Andy Courtney  became the first UCD player to represent the Ireland national rugby union team. The following UCD players also represented Ireland at full international level.

 Barry Bresnihan
 Eugene Davy
 Mick Doyle
 Tony Ensor
 Tom Grace
 Denis Hickie
 Rob Kearney
 Dan Leavy
 Fergus McFadden
 Luke McGrath
 Kevin McLaughlin
 Ray McLoughlin
 Seán O'Brien
 Brian O'Driscoll
 Kevin O'Flanagan
 Darragh O'Mahony
 Garry Ringrose
 Rhys Ruddock
 Ciaran Scally
 Fergus Slattery
 James Tracy
 Josh van der Flier
 Paddy Wallace

British & Irish Lions
In 1959 Niall Brophy and Bill Mulcahy become the first UCD players to represent the British & Irish Lions. Since then several UCD players have also played for the  Lions.

Ireland national rugby sevens team
 Harry McNulty
 Billy Dardis
 Hugo Keenan

Other internationals
The following UCD players have also played at international level.

See also

Honours

All-Ireland Cup
1937–38
 Leinster Senior Cup
1923–24, 1937–38, 1947–48, 1962–63, 1963–64, 1969–70, 1976–77, 2010–11, 2013–14, 2015–16, 2019–20:  11
Leinster Junior Challenge Cup
1914:  1

References

 
Rugby
Dublin
Dublin
Belfield, Dublin
Dublin
Rugby union clubs in Dún Laoghaire–Rathdown
Senior Irish rugby clubs (Leinster)